Dabil is an administrative ward in the Babati Rural District of the Manyara Region of Tanzania. According to the 2002 census, the ward has a total population of 13,769.

According to the 2012 census, the ward has a population of 16,781.

References

Babati District
Wards of Manyara Region